Asbjørn Berg-Hansen (September 14, 1912 – January 28, 1998) was a Norwegian boxer who competed in the 1936 Summer Olympics. He was born and worked in Oslo as an electrician.

Amateur career
Norway's most successful flyweight boxer, winning eight national championships between 1936 and 1950 (no championships were held during the war) - seven in the flyweight class, and one in bantamweight.

He was a member of the first official boxing contest between England and Norway on December 8, 1935, in the Oslo Colosseum; his opponent was Alfred Russell, which he would meet again a year later in the Olympics.

Olympic results
In 1936 he competed in the flyweight class and lost in the round of 16.
Defeated Alfred Russell (UK) points
Lost to Louis Laurie (USA) points

Honors
Norwegian Boxing Federation's gold watch, NBF's merit medal, NBF's honour badge, The King's Trophy for flyweight boxing and The King's Trophy for bantam boxing.

External links
 Profile
 BoxRec profile

1912 births
1998 deaths
Flyweight boxers
Olympic boxers of Norway
Boxers at the 1936 Summer Olympics
Norwegian male boxers
Sportspeople from Oslo
20th-century Norwegian people